Rolf Daleng (15 March 1930 – 18 March 1986) was a Norwegian dancer, choreographer and film actor.

He was among the first dancers appointed at Den Norske Opera, which was established in 1958, and danced the role of "Frantz" in the opening balley Coppélia. He danced in musicals at Det Norske Teatret and other stages, and participated in the 1962 drama film Tonny.

References

1930 births
1986 deaths
Norwegian male dancers
Norwegian choreographers
Norwegian male film actors